In statistics, the inverse Dirichlet distribution is a derivation of the matrix variate Dirichlet distribution.  It is related to the inverse Wishart distribution.

Suppose  are  positive definite matrices with a matrix variate Dirichlet distribution, .  Then  have an inverse Dirichlet distribution, written .  Their joint probability density function is given by

References

A. K. Gupta and D. K. Nagar 1999. "Matrix variate distributions".  Chapman and Hall.

Probability distributions